This is a list of listed buildings in Ishøj Municipality, Denmark.

The list

References

External links
 Danish Agency of Culture
 Thorsbro Vandværk Museum

Ishøj Municipality
Ishøj